Pozo Almonte is a city and commune of Chile located in the interior of Atacama Desert. It has been the capital of Tamarugal Province since this province was established in 2007. It has over 15,000 inhabitants.

Demographics
According to the 2017 census of the National Statistics Institute, Pozo Almonte had 15,711 inhabitants (8,987 men and 6,724 women). The population grew by 45% (4,881 persons) between the 2002 and 2017 censuses.

Administration
As a commune, Pozo Almonte is a third-level administrative division of Chile administered by a municipal council, headed by an alcalde who is directly elected every four years.

Within the electoral divisions of Chile, Pozo Almonte is represented in the Chamber of Deputies by Marta Isasi (Ind.) and Hugo Gutiérrez (PC) as part of the 2nd electoral district, which includes the entire Tarapacá Region. The commune is represented in the Senate by José Miguel Insulza (PS, 2018–2026) and José Durana (UDI, 2018–2026) as part of the 1st senatorial constituency (Arica and Parinacota Region and Tarapacá Region).

References

External links

  Municipality of Pozo Almonte

Communes of Chile
Oases of Chile
Populated places in El Tamarugal Province
Capitals of Chilean provinces
1875 establishments in Chile